Stevie Hoang is an English singer and record producer signed to
Mercury Records. and AVEX.

Career
Stevie Hoang (pronounced Hwong) learned to play piano at the age of eleven and showed he had talent. He started his musical career as a producer, working from his parents' house. He has often uploaded home videos of himself performing informal acoustic tracks at home.

In early 2008, Hoang's debut "home-made", self-produced, self-recorded and self-promoted debut album, This Is Me brought him to the attention of the Japanese market, where after repeated trips he has sold over 65,000 albums. He supported N-Dubz and Tinchy Stryder on their 2009 "Uncle B" tour. In 2008, he supported the Girls Aloud Tangled Up Tour.

He released the independent album All Night Long after This is Me; then in 2011, the album Unsigned. The album contains "Fight for You", a song Stevie Hoang penned as a single originally with Iyaz. The song was produced with RedOne in Los Angeles, but it was later given to singer Jason Derülo, who recorded it for his 2011 Future History, crediting Hoang as writer and released it as his third single from the album.

Personal life
Stevie Hoang was born in Birmingham, England. He moved to London with his parents when he was one year old.

Since Hoang's surname is a typical Vietnamese spelling of a Chinese name (Huang 黄), many of his fans assume that he is of Vietnamese descent. However, his family were ethnic Chinese from Guangdong Province, also known as Hoa who later moved to England in the 1980s. There have been many comments and debate in his YouTube videos about his ethnicity. Hoang acknowledged his origin in an interview with The Sunday Times. Hoang is an avid Manchester United supporter.

Discography

Albums
 2008: This Is Me 
 2009: All Night Long
 2011: Unsigned 
 2012: All For You 
 2013: The Collection 
 2015: Forever 
 2017: Undiscovered 
 2019: Secrets 
2021: Legacy 
2023: TBA

References

External links
  
  

1985 births
Living people
English male singer-songwriters
English people of Chinese descent
English record producers
Avex Group artists
21st-century English singers
21st-century British male singers